Luis Aguilar (born 22 April 1936) is a Mexican sailor. He competed in the 1964 Summer Olympics.

References

1936 births
Living people
Sailors at the 1964 Summer Olympics – 5.5 Metre
Mexican male sailors (sport)
Olympic sailors of Mexico